The 1965–66 Swedish Division I season was the 22nd season of Swedish Division I. Brynas IF won the league title by beating Vastra Frolunda IF in the playoff final.

Regular season

Northern Group

Southern Group

Playoffs

Quarterfinals
Djurgårdens IF – AIK 6–1, 7–1
Västra Frölunda IF – MoDo AIK 7–1, 4–3
Leksands IF – Södertälje SK 5–2, 3–4, 3–1
Brynäs IF – Wifsta/Östrand-Fagerviks IF 11–0, 7–2

Semifinals
Brynäs IF – Leksands IF 8–3, 3–1
Västra Frölunda IF – Djurgårdens IF 5–4, 2–6, 12–1

3rd place
Djurgårdens IF – Leksands IF 7–4, 7–7

Final
Brynäs IF – Västra Frölunda IF 4–1, 5–6, 7–1

External links
 1965–66 season

Swedish
Swedish Division I seasons
1965–66 in Swedish ice hockey